Senegalia pervillei is a species of Senegalia that is endemic to Madagascar. The species was first formally described by English botanist George Bentham in 1875 in Transactions of the Linnean Society of London. Two varieties are recognised:
Senegalia pervillei var. pervillei 
Senegalia pervillei var. pubescens Villiers & Du Puy

It occurs in dry grassland, woodland and forest areas of the provinces of Antsiranana, Mahajanga, and Toliara.

References

External links
Senegalia pervillei (photograph) - JSTOR plant science
Herbarium specimen at Royal Botanic Gardens Kew

pervillei
Endemic flora of Madagascar